Milanese in Naples (Italian: Milanesi a Napoli) is a 1954 Italian comedy film directed by Enzo Di Gianni and starring Eva Nova, Ugo Tognazzi and Carlo Campanini. The film's sets were designed by the art director Oscar D'Amico.

Synopsis
A northern industrialist arrives in Naples with the idea of building a factory to mass-produce the pizza specialities of the region, causing uproar from the locals. Eventually the two sides are reconciled through a double marriage.

Cast
 Eva Nova as Immacolata Santolillo 
 Ugo Tognazzi as Franco Baraldi 
 Carlo Campanini as Commendator Brambilla 
 Enrico Viarisio as Professor Clemente Simoni 
 Dolores Palumbo as Dottoressa Dora Vincenzi 
 Nino Taranto as Luigi Martiello 
 Carlo Sposito as Assistente del Prof. Simoni 
 Enzo Turco as 'Bersagliere', pizzaiolo fratello di Immacolata 
 Lilia Landi as Milly 
 Roberto Bruni as Ing, Velenzani 
 Loris Gizzi as Presidente della società 
 Amedeo Girardi as Attore che impersona 'O Zappatore' 
 Serena Michelotti as Figlia di Dora 
 Alfredo Rizzo as Alfredo 
 Ugo D'Alessio as Cantante col mandolino 
 Rino Salviati as Cantante con la chitarra 
 Anna Pretolani
 Piero Giagnoni as Bambino Peppiniello 
 Giovanni Luchetti as Sergio 
 Enza Soldi
 Massimo Seccia as Pasqualino 
 Lidialberta Moneta
 Vera Scialanca

References

Bibliography 
 Chiti, Roberto & Poppi, Roberto. Dizionario del cinema italiano: Dal 1945 al 1959. Gremese Editore, 1991.
 Marlow-Mann, Alex. The New Neapolitan Cinema. Edinburgh University Press, 2011.

External links 
 
 Milanese in Naples at Variety Distribution

1954 films
Italian comedy films
1954 comedy films
1950s Italian-language films
Films directed by Enzo Di Gianni
Films set in Naples
Italian black-and-white films
1950s Italian films